Otis Reservoir is a  reservoir located primarily in Otis, Massachusetts. Small portions are also in Tolland, MA, and Blandford, MA.  The lake is popular for boating, swimming, fishing, water skiing, snowmobiling, camping, and water-related recreation.  Fish include bass, white perch, yellow perch, tiger muskies, catfish, and bluegills. The reservoir is stocked with trout by the Massachusetts Division of Fisheries & Wildlife.

The current lake was formed from the flooding of three ponds, Rand, Little and Msssenger Ponds in 1865, by a dam across the Fall River, a tributary of the Farmington River created by the Farmington River Power Company.  It was used for water storage, ensuring a steady supply of water power for mills along the Farmington River.  In the early part of the twentieth century, the rise of the automobile led to the development of many seasonal cottages along the lake shore.  Building took place along most of the lake shore and on many inland lots.  These cottages were fairly inexpensive, being purchased by middle-class people: bankers, barbers, tradesmen, construction contractors, and others.

A trend that accelerated in the 1980s was for wealthy people to purchase cottages and upgrade or replace them with expensive second homes.  This trend continues.  Many people from Connecticut and New York use these as weekend or vacation homes.  In addition, many have converted their cottages into year-round residences.

Tolland State Forest, a popular camping, boat launch, and swimming area occupies about a quarter of the shoreline.  A private campground, Camp Overflow, is also located on the reservoir.  A small marina, D&J Marina, also run a boat launch facility on the north side of the lake. 

The reservoir fills in the spring from snow melt and underground springs. The lake is usually at full level by late spring, but in the occasional years of low snow melt and low rainfall, it may remain up to several feet below its typical level. Water is let out of the lake in the fall so that ice will not damage docks and other structures around the lake. This also leads to excellent water quality, as a significant portion of the water is replaced every year.

References

External links
 MassWildlife reservoir map and information
 Otis Reservoir Study-2000|55.9 KiB
Building of the Otis Reservoir, Otis, Massachusetts Excerpts From:  Samuel Watkinson Collins Memorandums, (Co-Founder of The Collins Company, Collinsville (Canton), Connecticut)

Lakes of Berkshire County, Massachusetts
Lakes of Hampden County, Massachusetts
Reservoirs in Massachusetts
Buildings and structures in Berkshire County, Massachusetts
Buildings and structures in Hampden County, Massachusetts
Protected areas of Berkshire County, Massachusetts
Protected areas of Hampden County, Massachusetts
Reservoir